Scary Movie 4 is a 2006 American science fiction parody film. It is the sequel to Scary Movie 3 and the fourth installment in the Scary Movie film series, as well as the first film in the franchise to be released under The Weinstein Company banner since the purchase of Dimension Films from Disney. It was directed by David Zucker, written by Jim Abrahams, Craig Mazin, and Pat Proft, and produced by Robert K. Weiss and Craig Mazin.

The film marks the final franchise appearances of the main stars, Anna Faris and Regina Hall (who portray Cindy and Brenda, respectively), and concludes the original story arc. This was initially intended to be the final film in the Scary Movie film series, until Scary Movie 5 was released by The Weinstein Company on April 12, 2013, in a different storyline, with Simon Rex, Charlie Sheen, and Molly Shannon in different roles. It grossed $178 million dollars, becoming the third highest grossing film in the series.

Plot 
Shaquille O'Neal and Dr. Phil wake up to find themselves chained to pipes in a bathroom. Their host, a talking puppet, reveals that the room is slowly filling with nerve gas with the only way out being to make a basket and get the saws, which have to be used on their feet. Unfortunately, Dr. Phil saws the wrong foot and faints, leaving the two to die.

Meanwhile, Cindy Campbell visits her brother-in-law, Tom Logan in New York City. Her husband George has died, and her nephew Cody has enrolled in military academy, leaving her heartbroken and lonely. Tom's attempted suicide results in his ingesting viagra, which greatly swells his penis and causes his death when he falls off the railing. Afterwards, Cindy takes a job to care for Mrs. Norris, who lives in a haunted house. Next door is Tom Ryan, who runs into George's friends Mahalik and CJ, learning about their homosexual one-night stand. He is greeted at home by the arrival of his estranged children, Robbie and Rachel. Over the following day, Cindy bonds with Tom, confiding to him about George's death in a fateful boxing match. The two realize their newfound love, but are interrupted by a gigantic triPod which disables electricity and starts vaporizing the town residents.

Cindy converses in mock Japanese with the haunted house's ghost, a silent boy with pale skin, learning that the answer of the invasion is his father's heart. While Tom leaves the city with his children, Cindy reunites with her friend, Brenda Meeks, inexplicably alive after her death. Following the Japanese boy's directions, the two head to the countryside and end up in a mysterious, isolated community. They are captured and put to trial headed by Henry Hale. The result allows them to live but never leave the village. Meanwhile, an emergency United Nations meeting, headed by the eccentric U.S. President Baxter Harris, who is reluctant to stop reading "My Pet Duck", goes awry when a weapon scavenged from the aliens renders everyone stark-naked.

Tom and his children drive and find themselves in the middle of a war between the U.S. military and the aliens. Excited with the conflict, Robbie runs away, while Tom and Rachel are taken by the triPod. Back at the village, Henry is killed by the village loon, Ezekiel, revealing to Cindy that he fathered the Japanese boy, who was killed during Cindy's boxing match. Cindy and Brenda are soon taken by the triPod and sent to the bathroom seen in the prologue, and they get stuck into the Venus flytrap. Cindy manages to get through the puppet's challenge, but is threatened with the safety of Tom and his children, who are put in traps. Looking at a toilet with the "heart" nearby, Cindy realizes that the Puppet, through Henry's wife, is the true biological father of the Japanese boy. Seeing how far Tom would go to save his children, the Puppet, who realizes his mistakes, apologizes for the invasion and releases them. Robbie and Rachel are successfully returned to their mother, who is revealed to have married a much older man. Brenda also becomes romantically involved with the Puppet's human brother, Zoltar.

An epilogue set one month afterwards, narrated by James Earl Jones who is subsequently hit by a bus, reveals Brenda's giving birth to her child with Zoltar, Mahalik and CJ resuming their relationship, and President Harris being contented with his duck. Meanwhile, Tom appears in The Oprah Winfrey Show and wildly confesses his love for Cindy by jumping around, throwing Cindy across the room, then breaking Oprah's wrists and hitting her with a chair afterwards.

Cast 

 Anna Faris as Cindy Campbell
 Regina Hall as Brenda Meeks
 Craig Bierko as Tom Ryan
 Leslie Nielsen as President Baxter Harris
 Bill Pullman as Henry Hale
 Anthony Anderson as Mahalik Phifer
 Kevin Hart as CJ Iz
 Beau Mirchoff as Robbie Ryan
 Conchita Campbell as Rachel Ryan
 Molly Shannon as Marilyn
 Michael Madsen as Oliver
 Chris Elliott as Ezekiel
 Carmen Electra as Holly
 Cloris Leachman as Emma Norris
 Garrett Masuda as Japanese Ghost Boy
 Craig Mazin as Saw Villian (voice)
 DeRay Davis as Marvin
 Henry Mah as Mr. Koji
 Patrice O'Neal as Rashed/CrackHead
 Tomoko Sato as Japanese Ghost Woman
 Kathryn Dobbs as School Teacher
 Bryan Callen as Agent Harper 
 David Zucker as Zoltar (voice)
 Angelique Naude as Waitress
 Rorelee Tio as Yoko
 Allison Warren as Polish Delegate
 Edward Moss as Michael Jackson
 Champagne Powell as Don King
 Dave Attell as Knifeman
 John Reardon as Jeremiah
 Kimani Ray Smith as Cutman
 Dale Wolfe as Hang Gliding Man

Cameo appearances 
 Shaquille O'Neal as himself
 Dr. Phil McGraw as himself
 Simon Rex as George Logan
 Charlie Sheen as Tom Logan (uncredited)
 Debra Wilson as Oprah Winfrey
 James Earl Jones as Narrator / Himself
 Holly Madison, Bridget Marquardt and Kendra Wilkinson as girls in Tom's bed
 Lil Jon as himself
 Fabolous as himself/gunman
 Chingy as himself
 Crystal Lowe as Chingy's girl
 Bubba Sparxxx as hoodlum
 Bone Crusher as hoodlum
 YoungBloodZ as themselves
 Michael McDonald as Tiffany Stone (female boxer)

Release

Home media 
The film was released on DVD on August 15, 2006 in rated (83 minutes) and unrated (89 minutes) editions with deleted scenes, bloopers, and outtakes. About 1,581,754 units were sold, bringing in $22,308,989 in revenue.

Reception

Box office 
In its opening weekend, the film grossed a total of $40.2 million, the third best opening weekend of the Scary Movie franchise. It has the best Easter weekend opening weekend ever, beating Panic Room which made $30.1 million in its opening and also the second best April opening, only $2 million behind Anger Management'''s record.
As of October 18, 2006, the film has grossed a total of $90,710,620 at the United States box office and $178,262,620 worldwide.

 Critical response 
Review aggregation website Rotten Tomatoes reports that 34% of 126 critics gave the film a positive review, with an average rating of 4.60/10. The site's consensus states, "Sure to inspire a few chuckles, but not enough to compensate for the recycled material from its predecessors." On Metacritic, film has an average of 40 out of 100, based on 23 critics, indicating "mixed or average reviews". Audiences surveyed by CinemaScore gave the film a grade "C+" on a scale of A+ to F.

Stephen Hunter of The Washington Post stated that while "Scary Movie 4 never takes you close to death by laughter [...] it's funny enough to turn the hands on your watch much more quickly than you can believe." Nathan Lee of The New York Times' described the film as being "organized on the principle of parody, not plot, [...] it's an exercise in lowbrow postmodernism, a movie-movie contraption more nuts than Charlie Kaufman's gnarliest fever dream. It's cleverly stupid."

 Accolades 
The film won a Golden Raspberry Award for Worst Supporting Actress (Carmen Electra, also in  Date Movie'').

See also 
 List of ghost films

References

External links 

 
 
 

Scary Movie (film series)
2006 films
2006 comedy horror films
2006 science fiction films
2000s American films
2000s English-language films
2000s parody films
2000s science fiction comedy films
2000s science fiction horror films
2000s supernatural horror films
American comedy horror films
American science fiction comedy films
American science fiction horror films
American sequel films
American supernatural comedy films
American supernatural horror films
Cultural depictions of Michael Jackson
Cultural depictions of Tom Cruise
Dimension Films films
Films about fictional presidents of the United States
Films directed by David Zucker (director)
Films produced by Robert K. Weiss
Films scored by James L. Venable
Films set in New Jersey
Films shot in Vancouver
Films with screenplays by Craig Mazin
Films with screenplays by Jim Abrahams
Films with screenplays by Pat Proft
Golden Raspberry Award winning films
Miramax films
Parodies of horror
Supernatural science fiction films
The Weinstein Company films